George Rankin Irwin  (February 26, 1907 – October 9, 1998) was an American scientist in the field of fracture mechanics and strength of materials. He was internationally known for his study of fracture of materials.

Early life and education
George R. Irwin was born in El Paso, Texas. His family moved to Springfield, Illinois where he went to school.

He attended Knox College in Galesburg, Illinois and earned an A.B. degree in English in 1930. After an additional year studying physics, he transferred to the University of Illinois at Urbana-Champaign where he studied from 1931 to 1935. He received his Ph.D. from the University of Illinois in 1937; his thesis was on the mass ratio of lithium isotopes.

Career
In 1937 he joined the US Naval Research Laboratory (NRL) in Washington D.C. where he worked until 1967. There he worked on ballistics, specifically on the mechanics of projectiles penetrating targets. Here he developed methods for determining the penetration force that a projectile exerts on its target. This work was completed throughout the Second World War. Part of this work led to the development of several nonmetallic armors (see vehicle armor). This coupled with his observation that thick armor plate made from ductile material (such as steel) failed in a brittle manner during test firings initiated his interest in brittle fracture.

In 1946 he was made responsible for the project on brittle fracture at the NRL and in 1948 he was promoted from the head of the Ballistics Branch of the NRL to associate superintendent of the Mechanics Division. In 1950 he was again promoted to superintendent of the Mechanics Division. He served in that capacity until his retirement from government service in 1967.

The classical approach to brittle fracture in the late 1940s had been developed in the early 1920s, following the work of A. A. Griffith. Griffith had shown that an instability criterion could be derived for cracks in brittle materials based on the variation of potential energy of the structure as the crack grew. The Griffith approach was global and could not easily be extended to accommodate structures with finite geometries subjected to various types of loadings. The theory was considered to apply only to a limited class of extremely brittle materials, such as glasses or ceramics. Irwin observed that the fracture process in metals involved nonelastic work at the crack tip. This observation permitted him to modify the Griffith theory by incorporating a plastic work of fracture in addition to the classical surface energy of crack formation.

As part of this work, Irwin defined the fundamental concept of a Stress Intensity Factor and the critical plane-strain stress intensity factor (KIC) which is a material property.

He was involved in the development of several standards and led several committees for the American Society for Testing and Materials (ASTM).

In 1967, Irwin was recruited to Lehigh University as the Boeing University Professor by long-time collaborator Paul C. Paris, the father of modern methods for predicting crack growth and its control in aircraft structures.  Irwin served for five years before reaching mandatory retirement age. In his tenure, he continued his collaboration with Paris, and collaborated with, influenced, or assisted many notable individuals in the fracture mechanics community, including:
F. Erdogan on cracks in thin-walled shell structures;
A. A. Wells of the British Welding Institute on characterizing fracture in normally ductile steel structures;
F. A. McClintock, Massachusetts Institute of Technology and John W. Hutchinson, Harvard University, on the development of fracture mechanics procedures in the presence of substantial ductility;
James R. Rice, Harvard University, on developing the J integral approach for characterizing the onset of crack growth in ductile materials;
L. B. Freund, Brown University, and M. F. Kanninen, Southwest Research Institute, on the dynamics of inertial limited crack propagation and arrest.

After retiring from Lehigh University in 1972, Irwin joined the faculty of the University of Maryland, College Park where he worked in the field of dynamic fracture, specifically concerned with crack arrest and the implications in a loss-of-coolant accident in a nuclear power plant.

Memberships and honours
Irwin was a member of the America National Academy of Engineering and a Foreign Member of the Royal Society of London.

Additionally, he received the following honours:-
1946 - Naval Distinguished Civilian Service Award
1947 - Knox College Alumni Achievement Award
1959 - ASTM Charles B. Dudley Medal
1960 - RESA Award for Applied Research
1961 - Ford Foundation Visiting Professorship, University of Illinois
1966 - ASTM Award of Merit
1966 - American Society of Mechanical Engineers (ASME) Thurston Lecture
1967 - Fellow, ASTM
1969 - University of Illinois Engineering Achievement Award
1969 - U. S. Navy Conrad Award
1969 - Alumni Achievement Award, University of Illinois
1973 - SESA Murray Lectureship Award
1974 - Lehigh University Academic Leadership Award
1974 - ASTM honorary member
1974 - American Society for Metals Sauveur Award
1976 - The Grande Medaille Award of the French Metallurgical Society of France
1977 - ASME Nadai Award
1977 - B. J. Lazan Award from the Society for Experimental Mechanics
1977 - Honorary degree, doctor of engineering, Lehigh University
1977 - Election to the National Academy of Engineering
1978 - ASTM-Irwin Award
1979 - Francis J. Clamer Clauier Medal of the Franklin Institute
1982 - Governor’s Citation for Distinguished Service to Maryland
1982 - Tetmajer Award of the Technical University of Vienna, Austria
1985 - Fellow, Society for Experimental Mechanics
1986 - ASME Timoshenko Medal
1987 - ASM Gold Medal for Outstanding Contributions to Engineering and Science
1987 - Elected to foreign membership, British Royal Society
1988 - ASTM Fracture Mechanics Award and the George R. Irwin Medal
1989 - Honorary membership in Deutscher Verband für Material Prufung
1990 - Honorary membership in the American Ceramic Society
1990 - Albert Sauveur Lecture Award
1992 - George R. Irwin Research Award, University of Maryland
1993 - Engineering Innovation Hall of Fame at the University of Maryland
1998 - A. James Clark Outstanding Commitment Award University of Maryland
1998 - Appointed Glenn L. Martin Institute Professor of Engineering

References

Bibliography
Dally, James W.,George R. Irwin, Memorial Tributes: National Academy of Engineering, Volume 10 (2002), p 146-153, National Academy of Engineering (NAE). http://darwin.nap.edu/books/0309084571/html/146.html

1907 births
20th-century American engineers
University of Illinois Urbana-Champaign alumni
Lehigh University faculty
Members of the United States National Academy of Engineering
1998 deaths
Foreign Members of the Royal Society
Fellows of the Society for Experimental Mechanics
Knox College (Illinois) alumni